Giannis Gounaris (Greek: Γιάννης Γούναρης; born 6 July 1952) is a Greek retired footballer and coach.

Career
Born in Thessaloniki, Gounaris was a right back who played for PAOK FC and Olympiacos FC in the 1970s and 80s. He earned 27 caps for the Greece National team, and participated in Euro 1980.

In the early 1970s Gounaris became known for his plowing runs down the whole right wing, transitioning defence into offence. His partnership with PAOK's left fullback Kostas Iosifidis became formidable not only for PAOK, but for the Greece national team as well. The two backs played a vital role in the team that won PAOK its first ever championship. The duo would go on to play in seven cup finals for PAOK, from 1970 through to 1978. Although Iosifidis decided to remain at PAOK for the duration of his career, Gounaris transferred to PAOK's most fierce rival Olympiacos, once his twelve-year contract expired. PAOK's fans never forgave him for what they saw as betrayal, but his fatal crosses and unceasing runs down the flank ensured that he would always be part of the club's history.

After his retirement as a football player, he went on to manage PAOK in the 1990s, as well as having a very brief tenure with Olympiacos He end his career with Makedonikos in 1987.

References

External links

1952 births
Living people
Footballers from Thessaloniki
Greek footballers
Greece international footballers
UEFA Euro 1980 players
Super League Greece players
PAOK FC players
Olympiacos F.C. players
Makedonikos F.C. players
Association football fullbacks
Greek football managers
Olympiacos F.C. managers
Xanthi F.C. managers
PAOK FC managers
Doxa Drama F.C. managers
Panionios F.C. managers
Kastoria F.C. managers
Panserraikos F.C. managers
Niki Volos F.C. managers
PAS Giannina F.C. managers
Panthrakikos F.C. managers
PAS Lamia 1964 managers
Anagennisi Giannitsa F.C. managers